Hippo Lite is the second studio album by duo DRINKS, which is made up of musicians Cate Le Bon and Tim Presley. It was released on April 20, 2018 through Drag City.

Composition
Musically, Hippo Lite digs its heels into avant-pop and "first-rate" experimental rock, but especially post-punk sounds that range from "abstract [and] harsh" to "quiet" and "playful". Acid folk and freak folk styles have also been seen.

Critical reception 
 
Hippo Lite was welcomed with generally positive reviews upon its release. On Metacritic, it holds a score of 74 out of 100, indicating "generally favorable reviews", based on 19 reviews.

Matthew Hogarth for DIY applauded it, noting its "moments of sheer chaotic genius married with brilliant songwriting".

Track listing

Personnel
Adapted from AllMusic's Credits page for this record.

DRINKS
 Cate Le Bon
 Tim Presley 

Additional musicians
 John Thomas II – drums 

Technical
 Stephen Black – engineering
 Samur Khojula – mixing
 JJ Golden – mastering

References

External links

 2018 albums
Drag City (record label) albums